Pineapple & Pearls is a restaurant located on Barracks Row in Washington, D.C., serving a fixed-price multi-course dinner. The Washington Post gave the restaurant a four star review, writing that Aaron Silverman, the chef and owner, "...pushes the fine-dining cause in only exquisite directions." 

The restaurant is next door to its sister restaurant, Rose's Luxury. A more casual daytime cafe operated in the front bar area of Pineapple & Pearls until December 2017, when the cafe, known as Little Pearl, opened its own location a few blocks away.

Awards
 2016 Best New Restaurants, No.1, The Washington Post.
 2017 Very Best Restaurants in Washington, No.1, Washingtonian (magazine).
 2017 Michelin Stars , the Michelin Guide.
 2018 Five Diamond Rating, the American Automobile Association.
 2020 Michelin Star  (Little Pearl), the Michelin Guide.

See also
 List of Michelin starred restaurants in Washington, D.C.

References

Restaurants established in 2016
Restaurants in Washington, D.C.
Michelin Guide starred restaurants in the United States
Fine dining
2016 establishments in Washington, D.C.